The following is a list of Florida Gators men's basketball head coaches. There have been 20 head coaches of the Gators in their 104-season history.

Florida's current head coach is Todd Golden. He was hired as the Gators' head coach in March 2022, replacing Mike White, who left to become the head coach at Georgia.

References

Florida

Florida Gators men's basketball coaches